The soundtrack to Planet Terror (Robert Rodriguez's segment of Grindhouse) was released on April 3, 2007 from Varèse Sarabande, though the score managed to sell on iTunes a week early. Rodriguez revealed at Comic-Con 2006 that inspiration for his score came from music composed by John Carpenter. Rodriguez said that during the filming of Planet Terror, Carpenter's music was often played on set.

Track listing
 "Grindhouse (Main Titles)" - (Robert Rodriguez)
 "Doc Block" - (Robert Rodriguez & Carl Thiel)
 "The Sickos" - (Robert Rodriguez & Graeme Revell)
 "You Belong to Me" - Performed by Rose McGowan (Pee Wee King, Chilton Price, & Redd Stewart)
 "Go Go Not Cry Cry" - (Robert Rodriguez & Rick Del Castillo)
 "Hospital Epidemic" - (Graeme Revell & Robert Rodriguez)
 "Useless Talent #32" - Performed by Rose McGowan (Rebecca Rodriguez & Robert Rodriguez) 
 "His Prescription... Pain" - (Robert Rodriguez & Carl Thiel) 
 "Cherry Darling" - (Robert Rodriguez)
 "The Grindhouse Blues" - (Robert Rodriguez)
 "El Wray" - (Robert Rodriguez)
 "Police Station Assault" - (Robert Rodriguez)
 "Dakota" - (Robert Rodriguez & Carl Thiel)
 "Zero to Fifty In Four" - (Robert Rodriguez)
 "Fury Road" - (Robert Rodriguez)
 "Helicopter Sicko Chopper" - (Graeme Revell & Robert Rodriguez)
 "The Ring in the Jacket" - (Robert Rodriguez & George Oldziey) 
 "Killer Legs" - (Robert Rodriguez & Rick Del Castillo) 
 "Melting Member" - (Graeme Revell & Robert Rodriguez)
 "Too Drunk to Fuck" - Performed by Nouvelle Vague (Jello Biafra)
 "Cherry's Dance of Death" - Performed by Chingon (Robert Rodriguez)
 "Two Against the World" - Performed by Rose McGowan (Rebecca Rodriguez & Robert Rodriguez)

See also
Death Proof (soundtrack)

References

Grindhouse (film)
2007 soundtrack albums
Robert Rodriguez soundtracks
Horror film soundtracks
Action film soundtracks
Comedy film soundtracks

de:Grindhouse (Film)#Soundtrack